Goragorsky is a rural locality (a settlement) in Nadterechny District of the Chechen Republic, Russia, located on the Gorga. Population:

References

Rural localities in Nadterechny District